Davis Dimock Jr. (September 17, 1801 – January 13, 1842) served briefly as a Democratic member of the U.S. House of Representatives from Pennsylvania from 1841 to 1842.

Biography
Davis Dimock Jr. was born in Exeter, Pennsylvania (near Wilkes-Barre, Pennsylvania).  He attended the schools of the pioneer settlement of Montrose, Pennsylvania, and the Susquehanna County Academy at Montrose.  He studied law, was admitted to the bar in 1833 and commenced practice in Montrose, and was also engaged in editorial work.

Political career
He was appointed Susquehanna County treasurer in 1834.

Dimock was elected as a Democrat to the Twenty-seventh Congress and served until his death in Montrose in 1842.  

Interment is in Montrose Cemetery.  Cenotaph at Congressional Cemetery in Washington, D.C.

See also
List of United States Congress members who died in office (1790–1899)

References
 Retrieved on 2009-5-15
The Political Graveyard

1801 births
1842 deaths
People from Exeter, Pennsylvania
Burials at the Congressional Cemetery
Democratic Party members of the United States House of Representatives from Pennsylvania
19th-century American politicians